In the European Netherlands, a safety region is a public body whose task is to facilitate regional cooperation in dealing with crises, disasters and disruptions of public order.

Each municipal executive belongs to one of the twenty-five safety regions. Together they are responsible for drawing up joint regulations for crisis management and for administering the emergency services (fire brigade and ) in their respective region.

List of safety regions

See also 
 Municipal Health Service

References 

Government of the Netherlands
Emergency management in the Netherlands
Subdivisions of the Netherlands